Chickenhead is an American English slang term that is typically used in a derogatory manner toward women. The term mocks the motion of the head while performing oral sex on a man, but contains social characteristics and cultural relevance as well, and is frequently heard in popular hip hop music. More recent uses of the term have seen it taken back by hip hop feminists and entertainers as a symbol of sexuality and power. "Chickenhead" is also a term used in overseas sex trafficking for individuals that facilitate and monitor a persons transition into sex work.

Etymology
Additionally, the song "Chickenhead" by Project Pat (featuring La Chat and Three Six Mafia) introduced this black vernacular term to a more mainstream audience. "Chickenhead" was defined as a "hoochie" or "fellatious woman" when featured on Chappelle's Show.

Rapper Cardi B released a remix of Project Pat's song in 2018, titled "Bickenhead", changing the message from largely mocking women to an expression of empowerment and sexual ownership. The song was largely well received, debuting at number 43 on the Billboard Hot 100 list in April 2018.

Use of the term "chickenhead" predates this and extends across the demographic makeup of American society. Examples include John Steinbeck's 1952 Novel "East of Eden", in which the (white) proprietor of a brothel indirectly refers to the working girls of her establishment as "chickenheads".  Dr. R. Flowers Rivera used the term "chickenhead" more recently, in a poem that identifies it as a woman who is impoverished and an alcoholic lacking empathy.

A chickenhead in the transnational sex trade is typically responsible for facilitating transportation, acquiring temporary lodging, and monitoring activities of the new sex worker, similar to the activities of a "pimp".

Derogatory and empowering
Ronald Weitzer and Charis Kubrin note that "A favorite rap term is 'chickenhead,' which reduces a woman to a bobbing head giving oral sex." Bakari Kitwana argues that many rappers refer to women, black women in particular, with demeaning terms names such as "bitches, gold diggers, hoes, hoodrats, chickenheads, pigeons, and so on." Johnnetta B. Cole argues that hip hop's tradition to refer to black women in such terms disrespects and vilifies them.

In Joan Morgan's When Chickenheads Come Home to Roost, she notes the derogatory tendency of the term "chickenhead", and further defines it as a woman who uses sex to achieve the things she wants. As a black, hip-hop feminist, Morgan offers that chickenheads simply use the tools afforded to them when other means are not efficient, and that all women may have something to learn from the use of sexual power

See also 
 Misogyny in rap music

References

Bibliography
 
 
 
 
 

African-American gender relations
African-American slang
Criticism of hip-hop
Fellatio
Hip hop phrases
Sexual slang
2000s neologisms